The Hat Act is a former Act of the Parliament of Great Britain (5 Geo II. c. 22) enacted in 1732 to prevent and control hat production by the colonists in British America.

It specifically placed limits on the manufacture, sale, and exportation of colonial-made hats. The act also restricted hiring practices by limiting the number of workers that hatmakers could employ, and placing limits on apprenticeships by only allowing two apprentices. The Hat Act was one of several legislative measures introduced by the British Parliament, seeking to restrict colonial manufactures, particularly in North American areas with available raw materials, and protect British manufactures from colonial competition.

This law's effect was that Americans in the colonies were forced to buy British-made goods, and this artificial trade restraint meant that Americans paid four times as much for hats and cloth imported from Britain than for local goods. It was repealed by the Statute Law Revision Act 1867.

In his A Summary View of the Rights of British America, Thomas Jefferson denounced the Act as "an instance of despotism to which no parallel can be produced in the most arbitrary ages of British history".

Further reading
Council of Law Reporting. The Law Reports. The Public General Statutes, with a list of the local and private Acts, passed in the thirtieth and thirty-first years of the reign of Her Majesty Queen Victoria. London. 1867. Pages 622 to 748.
A Collection of the Public General Statutes passed in the Thirtieth and Thirty-first Years of Her Majesty Queen Victoria. Printed by Eyre and Spottiswoode, Printers to the Queen. London. 1867. Pages 374 to 460. Digitized copy

References

Great Britain Acts of Parliament 1732
1732 in the Thirteen Colonies
Laws leading to the American Revolution
Headgear
Hatmaking
Clothing controversies
Repealed Great Britain Acts of Parliament